The Grammy Award for Best Immersive Audio Album (until 2018: Best Surround Sound Album)  was first awarded in 2005, as the first category in a new "Surround Sound" field.

This field currently holds the Best Immersive Audio Album award as its sole category.

It is one of a few categories which are open to both classical and non-classical recordings, new or re-issued. To qualify for this category, the recording must be in surround quality (with a minimum of four channels). The recordings must be commercially available on either DVD-Audio, DVD-Video, Blu-ray, SACD, surround download or a streaming-only version. The award goes to the engineer, mastering engineer (if any) and producer. These used to be called Surround Engineer, Surround Mastering Engineer and Surround Sound Producer, respectively, but from 2020 the descriptions are Immersive Audio Engineer, Immersive Audio Mastering Engineer and Immersive Audio Producer, respectively. Performing artists do not receive the award, except if they are also the surround (mastering) engineer or the surround sound producer.

The category was renamed Best Immersive Audio Album for the 2019 Grammy season. According to NARAS, "driven by the technological side of music evolution, the Best Surround Sound Album category [was] renamed Best Immersive Audio Album. The same goes for the Field to which it belongs. The change reflects evolving technology, new formats, and current industry trends, practices, and language."

On 24 November 2020 during the announcement of the nominations for the 63rd Grammy Awards, to be presented on 31 January 2021, the Recording Academy said there would be no winner or nominees in this category that year. "Due to the COVID-19 pandemic, the Best Immersive Audio Album Craft Committee was unable to meet. The judging of the entries in this category has been postponed until such time that we are able to meet in a way that is appropriate to judge the many formats and configurations of the entries and is safe for the committee members. The nominations for the 63rd Grammy's will be announced next year [2021] in addition to (and separately from) the 64th Grammy nominations in the category", the Academy stated. On 23 November 2021, at the presentation of the nominations for the 64th Grammy Awards, the nominations for the previous year were finally announced. The winning recording was announced on the 64th Annual Grammy Awards ceremony.

Winners and nominees
2023Legend:
* = Surround Mix Engineer (from 2020: Immersive Audio Engineer; from 2023: Immersive Mix Engineer)
† = Surround Mastering Engineer (from 2020: Immersive Audio Mastering Engineer; from 2023: Immersive Mastering Engineer)
‡ = Surround Producer (from 2020: Immersive Audio Producer; from 2023: Immersive Producer)

Legend:
* = Surround Mix Engineer (from 2020: Immersive Audio Engineer, from 2023: Immersive Mix Engineer)
† = Surround Mastering Engineer (from 2020: Immersive Audio Mastering Engineer, from 2023: Immersive Mastering Engineer)
‡ = Surround Producer (from 2020: Immersive Audio Producer, from 2023: Immersive Producer)

References 

Immersive
 
Album awards
Surround sound